Connect is a trade union representing construction, electrical, and technical workers in Ireland.

History
The union came into existence in 2001, when it was named the Technical Engineering and Electrical Union (TEEU).  It arose from an amalgamation between the Electrical Trades Union and the National Engineering and Electrical Trades Union. Both unions could trace their origins to 1920 when union activists in British based unions believed Irish workers needed autonomous representation in the emerging Irish state.

In 2016, members of the Union of Construction, Allied Trades and Technicians based in Ireland transferred to the TEEU.  In 2018, the union changed its name to "Connect".

Remit
The union represents a broad range of workers throughout industry and public service. It includes craftworkers, technicians, skilled operatives, general workers, technical, administration, and supervisory staff.

The TEEU is the largest engineering union in Ireland and the second largest in manufacturing, representing up to 40,000 workers.

General Secretaries
1997: Owen Wills
2010: Eamon Devoy
2016: Paddy Kavanagh

References

External links
 Official website

Trade unions in the Republic of Ireland
Trade unions established in 1992
1992 establishments in Ireland